The 2023 FIA World Endurance Championship will be the eleventh season of the FIA World Endurance Championship, an auto racing series organised by the Fédération Internationale de l'Automobile (FIA) and the Automobile Club de l'Ouest (ACO). The series is open to prototype and grand tourer-style racing cars divided into three categories. World Championship titles will be awarded to the leading drivers in both the prototype and grand tourer divisions and to the leading manufacturer in prototype division.

It is the first season in which LMDh (Le Mans Daytona h) entries will be allowed to compete in the Hypercar category for championship points alongside LMH (Le Mans Hypercar) entries, after being permitted on a race-by-race basis in 2022.  Upon the discontinuation of LMGTE Pro, LMGTE Am remains as the sole GT class in 2023, although it will be replaced after the 2023 season.  After being introduced for the 2021 season the LMP2 Pro-Am Cup was also dropped.

Calendar 
On 29 September 2022, the 2023 calendar was announced on the website and YouTube channel of the FIA World Endurance Championship, with the six races of the 2022 season and the return to Portimão, this time with a 6-hour format.

Entries

Hypercar

LMP2 
In accordance with the 2017 LMP2 regulations, all cars in the LMP2 class will use the Gibson GK428 V8 engine.

LMGTE Am

Results and standings

Race results 
The highest finishing competitior entered in the World Endurance Championship is listed below. Invitational entries may have finished ahead of WEC competitiors in individual races.

Drivers' championships

Hypercar World Endurance Drivers' Championship

FIA Endurance Trophy for LMP2 Drivers

FIA Endurance Trophy for LMGTE Am Drivers

Manufacturers' and teams' championships 
A world championship is awarded for Hypercar manufacturers and teams. FIA Endurance Trophies are awarded for LMP2 and LMGTE Am teams.

Hypercar World Endurance Manufacturers' Championship 
Points are awarded only for the highest finishing competitor from each manufacturer.

Endurance Trophy for LMP2 Teams

Endurance Trophy for LMGTE Am Teams

References

Notes

External links 
 

 
FIA World Endurance Championship seasons
World Endurance Championship
World Endurance Championship
|}